Brunhilde Hanke (née Anweiler; born 23 March 1930) is a German retired politician who was mayor of Potsdam and a member of the State Council of East Germany.

Early life 

Hanke was born in Erfurt into a working-class family. She completed an apprenticeship as a seamstress in 1947, during which she joined the Free German Trade Union Federation. She soon also became a member of the Socialist Unity Party of Germany (SED) and its youth organisation, the Free German Youth (FDJ). In 1951–52 she studied at the Komsomol academy in Moscow.

Political career 

From 1952 until 1963 Hanke was part of the FDJ's central council. Hanke became mayor of Potsdam in 1961. She kept the office until 1984. Afterwards, from 1987, she led the local  in Potsdam.

In 1967 she was made a member of the State Council of the GDR, the country's collective head of state. She remained a member of both institutions until 1990.

Hanke was awarded the Patriotic Order of Merit in bronze in 1974 and in silver in 1979.

References 

1930 births
Living people
Politicians from Erfurt
People from the Province of Saxony
Socialist Unity Party of Germany politicians
Free German Youth members
Free German Trade Union Federation members
Democratic Women's League of Germany members
Party of Democratic Socialism (Germany) politicians
The Left (Germany) politicians
Members of the State Council of East Germany
Members of the 4th Volkskammer
Members of the 5th Volkskammer
Members of the 6th Volkskammer
Members of the 7th Volkskammer
Members of the 8th Volkskammer
Members of the 9th Volkskammer
Female members of the Volkskammer
Mayors of places in Brandenburg
Recipients of the Patriotic Order of Merit in bronze
Recipients of the Patriotic Order of Merit in silver
21st-century German women politicians